Lundahl is a surname. Notable people with the surname include:

Amélie Lundahl (1850–1914), Finnish painter
Arthur C. Lundahl (1915–1992)
Christian Lundahl (born 1972), Swedish academic
Eskil Lundahl (1905–1992), Swedish swimmer
Harry Lundahl (1905–1988), Swedish footballer and manager
Karoliina Lundahl (born 1968), Finnish weightlifter
Mats Lundahl (born 1946), Swedish economist